Gammaproteobacteria is a class of bacteria in the phylum Pseudomonadota (synonym Proteobacteria).  It contains about 250 genera, which makes it the most genus-rich taxon of the Prokaryotes. Several medically, ecologically, and scientifically important groups of bacteria belong to this class. It is composed by all Gram-negative microbes and is the most phylogenetically and physiologically diverse class of Proteobacteria.

These microorganisms can live in several terrestrial and marine environments, in which they play various important roles, including extreme environments such as hydrothermal vents. They generally have different shapes -  rods, curved rods, cocci, spirilla, and filaments and include free living bacteria, biofilm formers, commensals and symbionts, some also have the distinctive trait of being bioluminescent. Metabolisms found in the different genera are very different; there are both aerobic and anaerobic (obligate or facultative) species, chemolithoautotrophics, chemoorganotrophics, photoautotrophs and heterotrophs.

Etymology
The element "gamma" (third letter of the Greek alphabet) indicates that this is Class III in Bergey's Manual of Systematic Bacteriology (Vol. II, page 1). Proteus refers to the Greek sea god who could change his shape. Bacteria (Greek βακτήριον; "rod" "little stick"), in terms of etymological history, refers to Bacillus (rod-shaped bacteria), but in this case is "useful in the interim while the phylogenetic data are being integrated into formal bacterial taxonomy."

Phylogeny
Currently, many different classifications are based on different approaches, such as the National Center for Biotechnology Information,  based on genomic, List of Prokaryotic names with Standing in Nomenclature , ARB-Silva Database based on ribosomal RNA, or a multiprotein approach. It is still very difficult to resolve the phylogeny of this bacterial class.

Here, it is reported a clade based on a set of 356 protein families for the class of Gammaproteobacteria.

A number of bacteria have been described as members of the Gammaproteobacteria, but have not yet been assigned an order or family. These include bacteria of the genera Alkalimonas, Gallaecimonas, Ignatzschineria, Litorivivens, Marinicella, Plasticicumulans, Pseudohongiella, Sedimenticola, Thiohalobacter, Thiohalorhabdus, Thiolapillus, and Wohlfahrtiimonas.

Significance and applications 

Gammaproteobacteria, especially the orders Alteromonadales and Vibrionales, are fundamental in marine and coastal ecosystems because they are the major groups involved in the nutrients cycling and despite their fame as pathogens, they find application in a huge number of fields, such as bioremediation and biosynthesis.

Gammaproteobacteria can be used as a microbial fuel cell (MFC) element that applies their ability to dissimilate various metals. The produced energy could be collected as one of the most environmentally friendly and sustainable energy production systems. They are also used as biological methane filters.

Phototrophic purple sulfur bacteria are used in wastewater treatment processes and the ability of some Gammaproteobacteria (e.g. the genus Alcanivorax) to bioremediate oil is becoming increasingly important to degrade crude oil after oil spills. Some species from the family Chromatiaceae are notable because might be involved in the production of vitamin B12. Another application of some Gammaproteobacteria is their ability to synthesize Poly-b-hydroxyalkanoate (PHA) which is a polymer that is used in the production of biodegradable plastics. Also lots of Gammaproteobacteria species are able to generate secondary metabolites with antibacterial properties.

Ecology 

Gammaproteobacteria are widely distributed and abundant in various ecosystems such as soil, freshwater lakes and rivers, oceans and salt lakes. For example, Gammaproteobacteria constitute about 6–20% (average of 14%) of bacterioplankton in different oceans; plus, current researches have revealed their worldwide propagation in deep-sea and coastal sediments. In seawater, Bacterial community composition could be shaped by miscellaneous environmental parameters, such as phosphorus, total organic carbon contents, salinity, and pH, and the higher is the soil pH, the higher is the relative abundance of Alphaproteobacteria, Betaproteobacteria and Gammaproteobacteria. The relative abundance of Betaproteobacteria and Gammaproteobacteria is also positively correlated to the dissolved organic carbon (DOC) concentration, which is a key environmental parameter shaping bacterial community composition. Gammaproteobacteria are also key players in the dark carbon fixation in coastal sediments, which are the largest carbon sink on Earth and the majority of these bacteria have not been cultured yet. The deep-sea hydrothermal system is one of the most extreme environments on Earth. Almost all vent-endemic animals are strongly associated with the primary production of the endo- and/or episymbiotic chemoautotrophic microorganisms. Analyses of both the symbiotic and free-living microbial communities in the various deep-sea hydrothermal environments have revealed a predominance in biomass of members of the Gammaproteobacteria.

Gammaproteobacteria have a wide diversity, metabolic versatility, and functional redundancy in the hydrothermal sediments, and they are responsible for the important organic carbon turnover and nitrogen and sulfur cycling processes. Anoxic hydrothermal fluids contain several reduced compounds such as H2, CH4, and reduced metal ions in addition to H2S. It has been proposed that hydrogen sulfide-oxidizing and oxygen- reducing chemoautotrophs potentially sustain the primary production in these unique ecosystems. In the last decades, it has been found that orders belonging to Gammaproteobacteria, like Pseudomonas, Moraxella, are able to degrade different types of plastics and these microbes might have a key role in plastic biodegradation.

Metabolism 
In the class of Gammaproteobacteria there is a wide diversity of metabolisms.

Some groups are nitrite-oxidizers and ammonia oxidizers like the members of  Nitrosococcus - with the exception of Nitrosococcus mobilis -  and they are also obligate halophilic bacteria. 

Among Gammaproteobacteria there are chemoautotrophic sulfur-oxidizing groups, like Thiotrichales, which are found as microbial biofilm filamentous communities in the Tor Caldara shallow-water gas vent in the Tyrrhenian sea . Moreover, thanks to 16S rRNA gene analysis, different sulfide oxidizers in the Gammaporteobacteria class have been detected, and the most important among them are Beggiatoa, Thioploca and Thiomargarita; besides, large amounts of hydrogen sulfide are produced by sulfate-reducing bacteria in organic-rich coastal sediments.

Marine Gammaproteobacteria also include aerobic anoxygenic phototrophic bacteria (AAP) that use bacteriochlorophyll to support the electron transport chain. They are believed to be an essential community in the oceans and are also well spread all around. 

Another type of metabolism carried out by Gammaproteobacteria is the oxidation of Methane, carried out by the order Methylococcales. They metabolize methane as sole energy source and are very important in the global carbon cycle. They are found in any site where methane sources are, like gas reserves, soils, wastewaters.   

Purple sulfur bacteria are anoxygenic phototrophic iron‐oxidizers and they are part of the genus Acidithiobacillus but, there are also two strains of Thiodictyon (Chromatiales order) -strain L7 and strain F4- and few species within the genus Thermomonas (order Lysobacter) that carry out the same metabolism.

In this class, there are numerous genera of obligate and generalist hydrocarbonclastic bacteria. The obligate hydrocarbonoclastic bacteria (OHCB) share the ability to utilize hydrocarbons almost exclusively as a carbon source and until now they have been found only in the marine environment. The genera carrying out this metabolism are Alcanivorax, Oleiphilus, Oleispira, Thalassolitus, Cycloclasticus and Neptunomonas. Subsequently, additional species such as Polycyclovorans, Algiphilus of the order Xanthomonadales and Porticoccus hydrocarbonoclasticus of the order Cellvibrionales that were isolated from phytoplankton. Groups of aerobic “generalist” hydrocarbon degraders can utilize hydrocarbons and nonhydrocarbon substrates as source of carbon and energy and are members within the genera Acinetobacter, Colwellia, Glaciecola, Halomonas, Marinobacter, Marinomonas, Methylomonas, Pseudoalteromonas, Pseudomonas, Rhodanobacter, Shewanella, Stenotrophomonas, and Vibrio.

The most frequent pathway to synthesize glucose among Gammaporteobacteria members is Calvin–Benson–Bassham (CBB) cycle but, a minority of species of this class may use the rTCA cycle. Thioflavicoccus mobilis (free living gammaproteobacteria) and "Candidatus Endoriftia persephone" (symbiont of the giant tubeworm Riftia pachyptila), present the possibility of using the rTCA cycle in addition to the CBB cycle. It has been showed that some species of Gammaproteobacteria may express two different carbon fixation pathways simultaneously.

Symbiosis 

Symbiosis is a close and a long-term biological interaction between two different biological organisms. A large number of Gammaproteobacteria are able to join in a close endosymbiosis with various species. Evidence for this can be found in a wide variety of ecological niches: on the ground, within plants, or deep on the ocean floor. On the land, it has been reported that Gammaproteobacteria species have been isolated from Robinia pseudoacacia and other plants, while in the deep sea a sulfur-oxidizing gammaproteobacteria was found in a hydrothermal vent chimney; by entering into symbiotic relationships in deep sea areas, sulfur-oxidizing chemolithotrophic microbes receive additional organic hydrocarbons in hydrothermal ecosystems.                                                                                                                                                                           Some Gammaproteobacteria are symbiotic with geothermic ocean vent-downwelling animals, and in addition, Gammaproteobacteria can have complex relationships with other species that live around thermal springs, for example, with the shrimp Rimicaris exoculata living from hydrothermal vents on the Mid-Atlantic Ridge.

Regarding the endosymbionts, most of them lack many of their family characteristics due to significant genome reduction.

Pathogens 
Gammaproteobacteria comprise several medically and scientifically important groups of bacteria, such as the families Enterobacteriaceae, Vibrionaceae, and Pseudomonadaceae. A number of human pathogens belong to this class, including Yersinia pestis, Vibrio cholerae, Pseudomonas aeruginosa, Escherichia coli, and some species of Salmonella. The class also contains plant pathogens such as Xanthomonas axonopodis pv. citri (citrus canker), Pseudomonas syringae pv. actinidiae (kiwifruit Psa outbreak), and Xylella fastidiosa. In the marine environment, several species from this class can infect different marine organisms, such as species in the genus Vibrio which affect fish, shrimp, corals or oysters, and species of Salmonella which affect grey seals (Halichoerus grypus).

See also 
 Betaproteobacteria
 Pseudomonadota

References

External links 
 

 
Pseudomonadota